Lake Dash is a mountain lake in Albania. It is located in the Prokletije, near the border with Kosovo. In English, Liqeni i Dashit means "Stag's Lake".

See also
Lake Sylbicë

Dash
Accursed Mountains